Sanjay Rattan is  an Indian politician and serving MLA from Jawalamukhi. Rattan defeated BJP candidate Ravinder Singh in 2022 assembly election.

Rattan has a postgraduate qualification in Personnel Management & Labour Welfare from Himachal Pradesh University. He won the assembly election for the first time in 2012.

References 

Himachal Pradesh MLAs 2012–2017
Indian National Congress politicians from Himachal Pradesh
Himachal Pradesh MLAs 2022–2027
1963 births
Living people
People from Kangra, Himachal Pradesh